The 1998 United States Senate election in Maryland was held November 3, 1998. Incumbent Democratic U.S. Senator Barbara Mikulski won re-election to a third term.

Democratic primary

Candidates 
 Barbara Mikulski, incumbent U.S. Senator
 Ann L. Mallory
 Kauko H. Kokkonen

Results

Republican primary

Candidates 
 Ross Pierpont, retired surgeon
 John Taylor
 Michael Gloth
 Kenneth Wayman
 Bradlyn McClanahan
 Howard David Greyber
 John Stafford, Chief Administrative Law Judge for the U.S. Department of the Interior
 George Liebmann
 Barry Steve Asbury
 Scott Thomas

Results

General election

Candidates 
 Barbara Mikulski (D), incumbent U.S. Senator
 Ross Pierpont (R), perennial candidate

Results

See also 
 1998 United States Senate elections

References 

United States Senate
Maryland
1998